= Prabhuwadi =

Village in Maharashtra

- Village
- Interactive map of Prabhuwadi
- Country: India
- State: Maharashtra

Prabhuwadi is a small village in Ratnagiri district, Maharashtra state in Western India. The 2011 Census of India recorded a total of 1,193 residents in the village. Prabhuwadi's geographical area is approximately 77 hectares (190 acres). chinchghar best village of Maharashtra
